The 1998 Aloha Bowl was a postseason college football bowl game between the Colorado Buffaloes of the Big 12 Conference and the Oregon Ducks of the Pacific-10 Conference. It was the last game of the season for these two schools and the last college game for Duck legend Akili Smith. Colorado won, 51–43

References

Aloha Bowl
Aloha Bowl
Colorado Buffaloes football bowl games
Oregon Ducks football bowl games
December 1998 sports events in the United States
1998 in sports in Hawaii